The Polytechnic University of Milan is the largest technical university in Italy, with about 42,000 students. 
The university offers undergraduate, graduate and higher education courses in engineering, architecture and design. 
Founded in 1863, it is the oldest university in Milan.

The Polytechnic University of Milan has two main campuses in the city of Milan, Italy, where the majority of the research and teaching activities are located, as well as other satellite campuses in five other cities across the Lombardy and Emilia-Romagna regions. 
The central offices and headquarters are located in the historical campus of Città Studi in Milan, which is also the largest, active since 1927.

According to the QS World University Rankings for the subject area 'Engineering & Technology', it ranked in 2022 as the 13th best in the world. It ranked 6th worldwide for Design, 9th for Civil and Structural Engineering, 9th for Mechanical, Aerospace Engineering and 7th for Architecture. Its notable alumni or professors include Nobel laureate Giulio Natta, novelist Carlo Emilio Gadda and architects Renzo Piano and Aldo Rossi.

History

The Polytechnic University of Milan was founded on 29 November 1863 by Francesco Brioschi, secretary of the Ministry of Education and rector of the University of Pavia. It is the oldest university in Milan. Its original name was Istituto Tecnico Superiore ("Higher Technical Institute") and only Civil and Industrial Engineering were taught. Architecture, the second main line of study at the university, was introduced in 1865 in cooperation with the Brera Academy.

There were only 30 students admitted in the first year. Over the decades, most of the students were men: the first female graduate from the university was in 1913.

In 1927 the university moved to piazza Leonardo da Vinci, in the district now known as Città studi (City of Studies), where the university's main facilities are still today. 
At the time, it was named Regio Politecnico ("Royal Polytechnic"). The word Regio was removed as Italy was proclaimed a republic at the end of World War II. The historical building still in use today was designed and built by engineers and architects all graduated from the university itself.

The present logo, based on a detail of the preparatory sketch of Raphael's School of Athens, was adopted in 1942. Until then, there was no official logo for the institution.

In 1954, the first European centre of electronic computation was opened at the university by Gino Cassinis and Ercole Bottani. In 1963 Giulio Natta received the Nobel Prize in Chemistry for his research on crystalline polymers, polypropylene in particular. In 1977, the satellite Sirio, jointly developed by the university and other companies, was launched.

Since the end of the 1980s, the university has begun a process of territorial expansion that would have resulted in the opening of its satellite campuses in Lombardy and Emilia Romagna. A university program in industrial design was started in 1993. In 2000, the university's faculty of design was created with new courses in undergraduate and postgraduate programs of graphic & visual, fashion and interior design along with the already existent industrial design.

In April 2012, the university announced that, beginning in 2014, all graduate courses would be taught only in English. This decision was then partially revised, after the decision of the Italian Supreme Court, that stated the Italian language could not be totally abolished nor downgraded to a marginal role.

Campuses

The University is spread over seven campuses: two main campuses in Milan  and another five satellite campuses across Lombardy and Emilia Romagna.

Milan Leonardo
Milan Leonardo is the oldest of the university's campuses still in use. The first buildings on Piazza Leonardo da Vinci were inaugurated in 1927. Over the years, the complex has been expanded and is now generally referred to as "Città Studi", City of Studies, which also refers to some faculties of the University of Milan in the same area. The campus extends over several streets: Leonardo, Bonardi, Clericetti, Mancinelli, Gran Sasso  and Colombo.

The Leonardo Campus is the main campus of the university and comprises the central administration offices, the rectorate, and most of the research departments.

Milan Bovisa
The Milan Bovisa campus is located in the Bovisa district of Milan and became active in 1989; campus Bovisa is today composed of campus Durando, opened in 1994, and campus La Masa, inaugurated in 1997. The first is the seat of the School of Design, while the second is dedicated to Industrial, Mechanical, Aerospace, and Energy Engineering faculties. Bovisa also houses the related research facilities, including the wind tunnel.

Other campuses
The first satellite campuses opened in 1987 in Como and in 1989 in Lecco. During the 1990s other three branches opened in Cremona (1991), Mantua (1994), and Piacenza (1997).

Academics
The Polytechnic University of Milan offers several three-year undergraduate courses, two-year graduate courses, one-year master courses and PhD programs in the fields of engineering, architecture and design. The university offers 32 first level (Bachelor) degree programs.

The academic year is divided into two terms, or semesters, the first from mid-September to late January and the second from March to late June. There are 3 exam sessions: those at the end of each semester (in February and July) and one more in September. Students need to achieve 60 "university credits" (CFU or Crediti Formativi Universitari) per year during their Bachelor's and master's degrees. Therefore, the 3-years Bachelor requires 180 credits while the 2-years Master 120.
The university, like most universities in Italy, is organized to comply with the framework of the Bologna Process.

The university maintains several relations with foreign universities and offers a wide range of international projects for student exchange, The university encourages the enrollment of foreign students by providing several courses in English, German and Spanish. It participates in the ENTREE network for student exchange among Electrical Engineering colleges in Europe and it is a member of Top Industrial Managers for Europe (TIME) network.

The Alta Scuola Politecnica is a joint institution of the Polytechnic University of Milan and Polytechnic University of Turin addressed to young talents who want to develop their interdisciplinary capabilities for leading and promoting innovation, and runs in parallel to the two-year programs of laurea magistrale (graduate courses).

International opportunities 
PoliMi offers several opportunities for students that want to integrate their studies with an experience outside Italy.
	
Some of them are:	
 ATHENS Programme	
 ERASMUS Programme
 Erasmus Mundus Programme
 Master of European Design
 Partnership of a European Group of Aeronautics and Space Universities	
 UNITECH International	
 Double degree with Tongji University, Shanghai, China
 Global Engineering Education Exchange

PhD students may also take advantage of "Progetto Rocca MIT-PoliMi Program", an international program that allows them to spend a visit period working at Massachusetts Institute of Technology.

Rankings

According to the QS World University Rankings the university is ranked as 137th overall in the world, the first Italian university in this ranking. 
By field of study, it is ranked 5th for Design, 11th for Architecture, and 16th for Engineering and Technology. 
More specifically, it was also ranked as the 7th best university in the world regarding civil and structural engineering topics.

As for Italian national rankings, the university was ranked the best university for Engineering and among the top big universities in Italy in the CENSIS-Repubblica Italian University rankings for the academic year 2011-2012.
In 2009 an Italian research ranked it as the best in Italy over indicators such as scientific production, the attraction of foreign students, and others.

Admission

Engineering
The admission in the undergraduate program in engineering at the university is bound to an admission test, aimed to verify the starting preparation of every student. The main goal of this test is to point out the lacks of aspiring students and, in case, to assign them an extra course. 
Only some programs have a strictly limited number of places, even if the Academic Senate fixes an approximate maximum number of students for every program.
The admission test for any Engineering school, except Construction Engineering, is divided in four  parts, each about one of the following general subject: English Language; Logic, Mathematics and Statistics; Verbal Comprehension; Physics.

Architecture, Design and Construction Engineering
Architecture, Design and Construction Engineering schools have a limited number of students admitted every year and the selection is based on a national test administered by the Ministry of Education. The test is divided into five parts, each about one of the following general subject: Logic and General Knowledge; History; Drawing and Representation; Mathematics and Physics.

Graduate programs
Admission to the graduate programs in the university requires an undergraduate degree and a set of requirements specific for each school, such as the time spent in obtaining the undergraduate degree or the grade point average scored during the undergraduate program.

The university also offers courses of study for the title of Dottore di Ricerca (PhD), MBA courses, and other postgraduate courses. MIP Business School is one of the most prominent management schools in Italy and was ranked as the 96th best business school in the world by Financial Times in 2011.

Departments 
The Polytechnic University of Milan is organized in 12 departments:

 Architecture and Urban Studies (DASTU)
 Architecture and Civil Engineering of the Built Environment (DABC)
 Chemistry, Chemical, and Material Engineering "GIULIO NATTA" (DCMC)
 Design (DESIGN)
 Electronics, Information Technology, and Bioengineering (DEIB)
 Energy (DENG)
 Physics (DFIS)
 Civil and Environmental Engineering (DICA)
 Management, Economics, and Industrial Engineering (DIG)
 Mathematics (DMAT)
 Mechanical Engineering (DMEC)
 Aerospace Engineering and Technology (DAER)

Library System and publishing
The library system of the university counts more than 470,000 records distributed over the libraries in the campuses. 
The system comprises four central libraries along with teaching libraries (department libraries). 
The titles registered in the library system can be searched through an online public access catalogue (OPAC).

Since autumn 2004, the Polytechnic University of Milan has owned a publishing trademark, Polipress, created mainly to publish researches by the university community. Polipress publishes also the free Politecnico periodical.

Scientific research 

The Polytechnic University of Milan participates in European and international networks of scientific research. In the year 2004 alone, about 60 large scale, multi-year international research projects have been initiated or participated by the university, just in the context of the European Research framework. As of 2012, the university takes part in over 132 current FP7 research projects.
The University raised almost 80% of its research funds from external sources in 2008, from participation in national and international calls for proposals by its researchers and from research contracts stipulated with companies.
The Polytechnic University of Milan was the first university in Italy for total number of European research funding awarded under the Horizon 2020 program, with 296 projects and a total of 125.7 million.

The university has a long history of research. Many scientists working in the university have received awards and recognition by the scientific community: among them, the most famous is Giulio Natta, the only Italian Nobel laureate for Chemistry, in 1963, who was the head of the Department of Industrial Chemistry.
The University also operated the first research nuclear reactor in Italy, the 50 kW LM54, from 1959 to 1979 in the "Enrico Fermi Nuclear Research Institute" and now operates several important laboratories such as one of the biggest wind tunnels in Europe.

As of 2005, a number of professors at the Polytechnic University of Milan are ACM or IEEE fellows.
The university participates in associations and consortia for applied research, has offices to assist technological transfers and continuing education for professionals. The university supports the establishment of research spin-offs (20 spin-offs from 2000 to today), and also of high-tech companies during their start-up phase, with a structure named Acceleratore d'Impresa (Start-up Incubator).

According to the SIR 2013 World Report about the quality of scientific research produced, the university has a normalized impact factor of 1.42, and 16.62% of the articles produced fall within the 10% most cited in the international bibliography.

Governance
The Rector, the Academic Senate and the Board of Directors (Consiglio di Amministrazione) are the governing bodies of the university.
Internal Financial Auditors (Collegio dei revisori dei conti) controls the management and finance of the University. There are several other consulting bodies, among them the Students' Council, which is directly elected by students and serves in an advisory role.

The Rector represents the University and coordinates the Academic and Research activity. The tenure of the Rector is six years and can serve only one term.

Student life 

Tuition fees at the Polytechnic University of Milan depend on each student's family income. They range between about 150 €/year and 3726 €/year. Students with an outstanding GPA (usually ≥ 27/30 or 29/30) are granted partial or full rebates, in addition to various kinds of scholarships. There are many scholarships for international students as part of the recent university internationalization strategy.

Most Italian universities do not offer accommodation for their students on campus. The university manages a limited number of approximately 2000 beds available for students. Most students from outside the city are either commuters or renters. It is common for both Italian and international students to share flats due to the expensive real-estate market of the city.

All the university campuses are covered by a Wi-Fi network, connected and interoperable with the Eduroam service.

Organizations 
The Istituto per il Diritto allo Studio Universitario (ISU) manages additional student facilities such as scholarships, student housing, open libraries, lending of computers, cafeterias and study spaces.

Educafe is a cultural center in the Leonardo campus, where students can meet and events are held regularly.

Among the student organizations:
 BEST Milano (Board of European Students of Technology) a European non-profit and politically neutral organization, focus on Empowered diversity, done by students for the students and present in more than 30 countries.
 ESN (Erasmus Student Network) a non-profit organization, gathering exchange students and encouraging exchange projects.
 Euroavia, an organization founded to gather aerospace students of the Polytechnic University of Milan and make easy to contact other aerospace students in Europe.
 Associazione Ingegneri Ambiente e Territorio (Environment and Territory Engineers Association), a student association composed by students in Environmental Engineering.
 Teatro delle Biglie ('Theatre of the Marbles'), an independent non-profit organization, born as a theatre association.
 POuL (Politecnico Open Unix Labs), a student association for students interested in promoting open source and free software.
 POLI.RADIO  is the student web radio.
 IEEE Student Branch of the Polytechnic University of Milan.
 BEA - Biomedical Engineering Association, an independent bioengineering students organization to create a network between students and professors, to promote activities and projects
 Skyward Experimental Rocketry, an association with the goal of design and developing small sounding rockets and unmanned aerial vehicles.
 Physis PEB.

Professional opportunities and statistics 
The 2007 graduate survey shows that 80% of graduates of the Polytechnic University of Milan find a job within three months from graduation, and almost 95% within six months.
The figures are similar for the bachelor and the masters level graduates. A specialized "Career Service" facilitates contacts between graduates and the industry, it invites companies for presentations and prepares statistics about graduated students. It posts several stage and job offers every day both for students and graduates.

Approximately 55% of undergraduate students complete their studies on time, and approximately 80% of them graduate within an additional year. Similar figures apply to graduate students.

Student politics 
Students at the university elect representatives in the Academic Senate, the Board of Directors and in the Boards of Schools.
Currently, there are four main political groups in student elections:
La Terna Sinistrorsa ("The left-hand coordinate system"), the left-wing organization. The name is a pun on the Cartesian three-dimensional coordinate system.
Lista aperta per il diritto allo studio ("Open list for the right to study"), a movement based on the value of student's quality, generally considered as conservative because of its affinity to the Catholicism and Communion and Liberation, even if it defines itself as not politically oriented;
 Svoltastudenti - La Students' Union del Politecnico di Milano ("The Students' Union of the Polytechnic University of Milan"), which takes inspiration from the Anglo-Saxon student-groups, is not politically oriented or religiously sided and its main purpose is to provide services to students.
Studenti Indipendenti ("Independent Students")
There are also other smaller groups. However, participation in student elections is generally low, as a result of low participation in extra academical activities. In the last elections, it figured out a new wave of interest, with 20% of participation (after the 16% of the previous ones).

Notable alumni

Franco Albini (architect, designer, and academic, 1905–1977)
Maria Artini (first female university graduate in electrical engineering in Italy and the second female engineering graduate of the Milan Polytechnic, 1894–1951)
Sergio Asti (1926–1921)
Gae Aulenti (architect and designer 1927–2012)
Mario Bellini (architect and designer, b. 1935)
Andrea Branzi (architect and designer, b. 1938)
Cini Boeri (architect and designer, 1924–2020) 
Gaetanina Calvi (in 1913 the first woman to graduate in engineering from the Milan Polytechnic) 
Anna Castelli Ferrieri (architect and designer, 1918–2006)
Achille Castiglioni (architect and designer, 1918–2002)
Enrico Castiglioni (engineer and architect, 1914–2000)
Livio Castiglioni (architect and designer, 1911–1979)
Pier Giacomo Castiglioni (architect and designer, 1913–1968)
Claudio Ciborra (organizational theorist, 1951–2005)
Antonio Citterio (architect and designer, b. 1950)
Gian Paolo Dallara (engineer and entrepreneur, b. 1936)
Carla De Benedetti (photographer and photojournalist, 1932–2013)
Elio (musician, b. 1961)
Amedeo Felisa (businessman, b. 1946)
Gianfranco Ferré (fashion designer, 1944–2007)
Enrico Forlanini (engineer and inventor, 1848–1930)
Stelio Frati (aeronautical engineer, 1919–2010)
Emanuela Frattini Magnusson (architect and designer, b. 1959)
Gianfranco Frattini (architect and designer 1926–2004)
Carlo Emilio Gadda (engineer and writer, 1893–1973)
Francesco Giavazzi (economist, b. 1949)
Vittorio Gregotti (architect, 1927–2020)
Franca Helg (architect and designer, 1920–1989)
Piero Lissoni (architect and designer, b. 1956)
Vico Magistretti (industrial designer and architect, 1920–2006)
Angelo Mangiarotti (architect and industrial designer, 1921–2012)
Alberto Meda (engineer and designer, b. 1935 )
Giulio Natta (chemist and Nobel Laureate, 1903–1979)
Gilbert Daniel Nessim (chemist, b. 1966)
Adriano Olivetti (chemical engineer and entrepreneur, 1901–1960)
Antonio Pedotti (bioengineer)
Giovanni Pellegrini (architect, 1908–1995)
Stefano Pessina (billionaire businessman, b. 1941)
Nicola Pezzetta (architect and artist, b. 1963)
Renzo Piano (architect, b. 1937)
Giovanni Battista Pirelli (entrepreneur, 1848–1932)
Gio Ponti (architect, 1891–1979)
Adele Racheli (first woman engineering graduate, founder of patent protection office 1897 - 1992) 
Ernesto Nathan Rogers (architect, 1909–1969)
Aldo Rossi (architect, 1931–1997)
Francesco Starace (business executive, b. 1955)
Saul Steinberg (cartoonist and illustrator, 1914–1999)
Giuseppe Terragni (architect, 1904–1943)
Patricia Urquiola (architect and designer, b.1961)
Massimo Vignelli (designer, 1931–2014)
Tatiana Wedenison (first woman in Italy to attempt an engineering degree. Graduated in 1894 with a degree in natural sciences.)
Marco Zanuso (architect and designer, 1916–2001)

See also 

 :Category:Academic staff of the Polytechnic University of Milan
 List of universities in Italy
 University of Milan
 Bocconi University

Notes and references

External links 
 Polytechnic University of Milan website
 Brief history of the Polytechnic University of Milan
AlumniPolimi - Polytechnic University of Milan Alumni
Profile of the Polytechnic University of Milan on the Times Higher Education website

 
Engineering universities and colleges in Italy
1863 establishments in Italy
Educational institutions established in 1863
Architecture schools in Italy

ko:밀라노 공과대학교